Mount Ferguson is an irregular, mound-shaped mass,  high, which surmounts the south part of the Mayer Crags on the west side of Liv Glacier, in the Queen Maud Mountains of Antarctica. It was discovered and photographed by the Byrd Antarctic Expedition (1928–30), and named for Homer L. Ferguson, president of the Newport News Shipbuilding and Dry Dock Co., Newport News, VA, which made repairs and alterations on Byrd Expedition ships.

See also
Tantalus Bluffs

References 

Mountains of the Ross Dependency
Dufek Coast